American Champion Aircraft Corporation, is a manufacturer of general aviation aircraft headquartered at the Rochester, Wisconsin airport. Founded in 1988 on the acquisition of the Champ, Citabria, Scout, and Decathlon, it has been producing replacement parts for these aircraft since that time. It has also been producing new aircraft since 1990.

The Champ, Citabria, Decathlon, and Scout designs were obtained from Bellanca which had acquired Champion Aircraft Corporation in 1970.   While Bellanca was responsible for the design of the Scout, the designs and type certificates for the Champ, Citabria and Decathlon originated from Champion Aircraft Corporation.

Aircraft

External links

American Champion Aircraft website

Aircraft manufacturers of the United States
Manufacturing companies based in Wisconsin
Racine County, Wisconsin
American companies established in 1988
Manufacturing companies established in 1988
Privately held companies based in Wisconsin